Laetesia minor is a species of sheet weaver found in New Zealand. It was described by Millidge in 1988.

References

Linyphiidae
Spiders of New Zealand
Spiders described in 1988